Ideal English School in Furus, India is an institution of higher education. It was established in 1981. It offers education in English.

Location
The college is located in the Academic Arena of Furus on the Furus-Poynar-Pisai road categorised under Other District Roads. The length of road is around seven kilometres. This road leads to Poynar Dam via Falsonda then Pisai and then connects to Mandangad Road. This road is a short route via Ambet to Mumbai. This road is a tar road now and was constructed under the Employment Guarantee Scheme by the Government of Maharashtra. This road was first constructed with the help of locally available raw materials under the initiative of the then Sarpanch of Furus Garam Panchayat, Mr. Kamaluddin from Falsonda. Some anti-progress people then lay down on the road to stop it from being constructed. This visionary Sarpanch then stopped that part of the job and started digging in another area. This was how this road was finally completed which now plays a vital role in connecting Furus to the surrounding areas.

History 
The College was founded in 1981 by the Child Welfare Society dominated by Muslim women under the guidance and physical support of Professor Shams Parkar and the financial support of others as an unaided kindergarten controlled by Singal Teacher Mr. Sabir Ali from Pune. This was followed each year by the construction of one extra class in a rented facility until it reached Standard Seven. Later on the society constructed its own building on land donated by a family locally known as Koske by raising funds through donations and charity shows. The School grew further to Secondary School Certificate level and later started as a Junior College of Commerce. Beginning in the academic year of June, 2010, the College has started F.Y.B.Com and further developments will be done to degree level in years 2011 and 2012. This social cause is supported by generous Donors such as resident and non-resident Furusians. One donor is Mr. Rahim Dawood Parkar, a banking professional in Bagrain and a social worker of Furus Child Welfare Society.

Campus politics 
Campus life is relatively free from the activism seen at most other Indian educational institutions. Co-Education is provided for boys and girls of all local and surrounding communities irrespective of their religion, caste, race, colour and economic or social status. All are treated equally as children of almighty God. There is no campus politics as management and office bearers are well aware of their social responsibilities and duties.

See also
S.I. High School & Junior College, Furus

References

https://web.archive.org/web/20100823133058/http://www.fwskuwait.com/

English-language education
Schools in Maharashtra
Ratnagiri district